Piru is a small unincorporated historic town located in eastern Ventura County, California, in the Santa Clara River Valley near the Santa Clara River and Highway 126, about seven miles (11 km) east of Fillmore and about  west of Interstate 5. Lake Piru, in the Los Padres National Forest, is the main recreational attraction. The population was 2,063 at the 2010 census, up from 1,196 when the 2000 census was enumerated. For statistical purposes, the United States Census Bureau has defined Piru as a census-designated place (CDP), which does not precisely correspond to the historical community.

Etymology
Although the town is located in the traditional homelands of the Tataviam, the name Piru (originally pronounced "Pea-roo") derives from the Chumash word pí idhu-ku, which referred to the tule reeds growing along Piru Creek that were used in making baskets. The traditional name is still in use by local residents.

Also designated and delineated as "Piro", adjacent to "Piro Creek" on 19th century atlas maps, (i.e. A. L. Bancroft's 1876 map of CA, NV, AZ, UT)  It was first named Piru City in 1888.

History

Indigenous 
The area was originally inhabited by the Tataviam, who often established villages along near permanent water sources at lower elevations, including Piru Creek and the Santa Clara River. The Tataviam village of Piiru was the original village of the area. There was also a nearby shared village between the Tataviam and Chumash of Kamulus in the corridor. 

Piru Creek was generally known as the place where the Chumash and Tataviam shared the land with one another, being on the respective edges of each of their lands. Important plant foods for the Tataviam included yucca stalks and hearts, acorns, sage seeds, juniper and holly leaf cherry berries. The yucca hearts were collected in the spring each year and roasted in earth ovens.

Rancho and settler town 
The town was founded in 1887 by David C. Cook from Elgin, Illinois, a wealthy publisher of Sunday School tracts and supplies who bought the Rancho Temescal Mexican land grant from the sons of Ygnacio del Valle. Wanting to establish a "Second Garden of Eden" in this part of the Santa Clara River Valley, Cook specified, tradition says, that the acreage be planted with fruits identified with the Biblical garden—apricots, dates, figs, grapes, olives and pomegranates. That same year, he built his first home, a Colonial Revival structure, at the southwest corner of Main and Center Streets.

The coast rail line was built through the valley in 1887. Because a small depot was already going to be built in nearby Camulos, Charles Crocker of Southern Pacific Railroad refused to build a depot in Piru. This so annoyed Cook that he built his own depot and hired a stationmaster. Cook laid out the town around the railroad in 1888.

The U.S. Post Office Department established the Piru Post Office on June 14, 1888. Legend has it that the change in pronunciation was brought about by conductors of Southern Pacific Railroad trains, who would shout out, "Pie-roo!" when pulling into town. Another story tells of a Piru restaurant known for good pies. The owner hung a sign proclaiming, "We Put The Pie In Piru."

In 1890, Cook built a lavish Queen Anne Style home a few blocks northwest of his original home, which came to be known as the Piru Mansion. A strict Methodist, he provided for construction of a church on the north side of Center Street, just west of Main. The church front is used in the movie J.W.Coop starring Cliff Robertson (1972). His home at Main and Center became the Piru Hotel. Cook sold out to the Piru Oil and Land Company in 1900 after being cured of his ailments and realizing a profit due to recent oil discoveries.

For her novel Ramona (1884), Helen Hunt Jackson had used nearby Rancho Camulos as one of the settings. Portions of the 1910 silent movie of the same name, starring Mary Pickford, were shot there. During the production, Pickford, D.W. Griffith and others of the cast and crew, stayed at the Piru Hotel. The hotel later became known as the Mountain View Hotel. The name was later changed to the Round Rock Hotel, because of a large, round boulder located in the northeast corner of the front yard.

20th century 
Juan José Fustero (b. ca. 1836), who called himself "the last full-blooded Piru Indian," died on June 30, 1921. In 1961, a plaque to honor him was placed in Piru Canyon near the place where he lived most of his life.

On December 17, 1922, Jenks Harris, a would-be cowboy actor, and a gang of partners in crime, which included another actor and the president of the Pacific Autoplane Company, robbed the bank in Piru of $11,000. He said, when later caught in Los Angeles, that he conceived of the idea while on location at Piru with the film company Universal and stated he committed the robbery to pay his parent's mortgage. The gang was each sentenced from one year to life in prison at San Quentin. 

In the 1950s, the Round Rock Hotel became the Round Rock Rest Home for elderly tenants, which it remained until 1989. The architectural style and pastoral setting made it a draw for the film industry. It was used in as a set in films such as “The Five Heartbeats” (1991) and “The Silhouette.” (1990).

It then became the Heritage Valley Inn. It is no longer functioning as an inn.

Disasters 
Piru was struck by two major disasters in the 20th century. On the night of March 12, 1928, the St. Francis Dam, to the east in Los Angeles County, broke, sending a torrent of water through the Santa Clara River Valley and causing the deaths of approximately 400 people, a number of which were in Piru. The Northridge earthquake of January 17, 1994, destroyed several buildings in the historic downtown area.

Geography
Piru is located at  (34.407297, −118.799675).

Elevation: .

Piru is located in the Santa Clara River Valley.

Climate
This region experiences warm (but not hot) and dry summers, with no average monthly temperatures above .  According to the Köppen Climate Classification system, Piru has a warm-summer Mediterranean climate, abbreviated "Csb" on climate maps.

Economy
Piru has the highest percentage of agricultural workers and second-highest percent of manufacturing workers in Ventura County. 32% have occupations in manufacturing, while 28% are employed in the agricultural sector.

Piru had the lowest median home prices in Ventura County in 1999.

Demographics

2010
The 2010 United States Census reported that Piru had a population of 2,063. The racial makeup of Piru was 1,063 (51.5%) White, 16 (0.8%) African American, 43 (2.1%) Native American, 11 (0.5%) Asian, 0 (0.0%) Pacific Islander, 830 (40.2%) from other races, and 100 (4.8%) from two or more races. Hispanic or Latino of any race were 1,748 persons (84.7%).

The Census reported that 2,063 people (100% of the population) lived in households, 0 (0%) lived in non-institutionalized group quarters, and 0 (0%) were institutionalized.

There were 523 households, out of which 292 (55.8%) had children under the age of 18 living in them, 329 (62.9%) were opposite-sex married couples living together, 69 (13.2%) had a female householder with no husband present, 39 (7.5%) had a male householder with no wife present.  There were 29 (5.5%) unmarried opposite-sex partnerships, and 2 (0.4%) same-sex married couples or partnerships. 67 households (12.8%) were made up of individuals, and 25 (4.8%) had someone living alone who was 65 years of age or older. The average household size was 3.94.  There were 437 families (83.6% of all households); the average family size was 4.34.

The population was spread out, with 676 people (32.8%) under the age of 18, 243 people (11.8%) aged 18 to 24, 569 people (27.6%) aged 25 to 44, 420 people (20.4%) aged 45 to 64, and 155 people (7.5%) who were 65 years of age or older.  The median age was 29.4 years. For every 100 females, there were 106.5 males.  For every 100 females age 18 and over, there were 105.2 males.

The homeowner vacancy rate was 1.6%; the rental vacancy rate was 4.3%.  1,202 people (58.3% of the population) lived in owner-occupied housing units and 861 people (41.7%) lived in rental housing units.

2000
As of the census of 2000, there were 1,196 people, 308 households, and 263 families residing in the CDP. The racial makeup of the CDP was 53.51% White, 0.25% African American, 3.01% Native American, 1.67% Asian, 38.38% from other races, and 3.18% from two or more races. Hispanic or Latino of any race were 67.89% of the population.

There were 308 households, out of which 52.6% had children under the age of 18 living with them, 67.2% were married couples living together, 12.3% had a female householder with no husband present, and 14.3% were non-families. 9.1% of all households were made up of individuals, and 4.5% had someone living alone who was 65 years of age or older.  The average household size was 3.88 and the average family size was 4.11.

In the CDP, the population was spread out, with 35.1% under the age of 18, 11.3% from 18 to 24, 28.4% from 25 to 44, 17.5% from 45 to 64, and 7.7% who were 65 years of age or older.  The median age was 28 years. For every 100 females, there were 99.7 males.  For every 100 females age 18 and over, there were 98.0 males.

The median income for a household in the CDP was $41,490, and the median income for a family was $40,703. Males had a median income of $32,303 versus $17,159 for females. The per capita income for the CDP was $14,337.  About 16.4% of families and 27.1% of the population were below the poverty line, including 36.5% of those under age 18 and 16.1% of those age 65 or over.

Infrastructure

Ventura County Waterworks District No. 16 provides water and sewer service to the more densely populated historic town center around the railroad line on the west side of Piru Creek. The district's service area also includes a small area east of the creek and certain areas south of the settlement along Main Street.

Education
Fillmore Unified School District operates Piru Elementary School. The district also operates Fillmore Middle School and Fillmore High School in Fillmore.

Use as filming location

Piru has been used for shooting film and television productions over the years, including Desert Fury (1947). Location scenes were shot with the northwest side of Center Street, at Main, used as the exterior of Fritzi Haller's saloon and casino; the Piru Mansion was used as the Haller home and the historic Piru bridge, crossing Piru Creek on the east side of town, was used as the locale of the car crash. (Some of the exterior scenes were also filmed in the Old Town section of Cottonwood, Arizona, especially where Burt Lancaster enters the Old Town jail, extant though enlarged.) Piru was also used in the scene in A Star Is Born (1954) starring Judy Garland and James Mason where Jack Carson's character, Libby, finds them after they are married. Piru was also featured in the 1966 film Incident at Phantom Hill.

Piru stood in for a fictional town Clarksberg, California in the 1974 TV movie The California Kid. Piru was used as a location for the 1974 Rockford Files episode 'Caledonia, It's Worth a Fortune.' It was used for exterior shots in the 1975 Filmation children's series The Ghost Busters. "Charlie's Angels," filmed "Angel's on Vacation" in Piru in 1979. Scenes in The Fugitive, The A-Team, The Dukes of Hazzard, Murder, She Wrote, NCIS and Monk were filmed in Piru. In the 1981 made-for-TV horror film Dark Night of the Scarecrow, several of the primary locations in the film, including the café, post office and service station, are in Piru.

In Twilight Zone: The Movie (1983), the scenes of the rest home in the "Kick the Can" segment were filmed at the historic building that is now the Heritage Valley Inn. Dolly Parton and Sylvester Stallone filmed scenes for Rhinestone (1984), in Piru. Also Silent Night Deadly Night 3 was filmed here, in 1984.

The town served as the fictional San Remos countryside in the movie Cobra, starring Sylvester Stallone, Reni Santoni and Brigitte Nielsen.

With the exception of a few scenes, the entire comedy Happy, Texas (1999) was filmed in Piru. It was also used for scenes of Bubble Boy. The exterior of Piru United Methodist Church was used in Big Momma's House (2001). The chase scene in Enough (2002) starring Jennifer Lopez was filmed in Piru along with scenes from Torque (2004) and the final scene for Van Helsing (2004).

The 2005 movie The Amateurs starring Jeff Bridges was largely filmed in Piru – as was much of the television movie The Love War (1970) starring Jeff's father Lloyd Bridges, with Angie Dickinson (with Piru serving as location and setting). The town has also served for some of the scenes on TV's Reno 911! and for scenes set in the fictional town of Bon Temps, Louisiana, in True Blood.

In the Disney movie Race to Witch Mountain (2009) starring Dwayne "The Rock" Johnson, scenes where he and the alien boy and girl go into a small town, Stony Creek, where they have repairs done on his taxi and go to a restaurant/country music club, were actually shot in Piru, which continues to be a popular location with film companies.

Piru Mansion was used as the home of Ellis Wyatt in Atlas Shrugged: Part I (2011), the first segment in a three-part movie adaptation of the novel by Ayn Rand. Piru was also used to film the 2011 music video Don't Stop (Colour on the Walls), from the band Foster the People and featuring actress Gabourey Sidibe.

The Dexter season 6 episode Nebraska which aired in 2011 was partially filmed in Piru, with Piru standing in for parts of Nebraska.

The 2013 music video for the hit Wake me up by Avicii, starring the Russian model Kristina Romanova and the young Californian model Laneya Grace.

Water for Elephants was also filmed in Piru as well as Alicia Keys' Unthinkable music video.

The 2014 action-drama film Swelter, starring Jean-Claude Van Damme, Lennie James, and Alfred Molina, was filmed entirely in Piru, per the DVD credits, with the town substituting for Baker, Nevada.

The 2017 movie Lucky, starring Harry Dean Stanton, was filmed in Piru.

Notes

References

External links

 TrainWeb.org – First Train to Piru in Years!

Census-designated places in Ventura County, California
Populated places established in 1887
History of Ventura County, California
Census-designated places in California
1887 establishments in California